Emilio Lari is an Italian-born movie stills photographer.

Career
Emilio started his career by bluffing his way on to the set of Richard Lester's A Hard Day's Night in 1964. On set, the crew and actors happened to be waiting for a photographer from L’European magazine and welcomed Lari accordingly. Emilio happily played the role until he was exposed when the official photographer arrived. However, his talent and friendly approach led to an  invitation to the filming of Help! in 1965.

Lari's charm and happy-go-lucky attitude took him through 40 years of European and Hollywood movies – from the cult 1966 hit Barbarella and Franco Zeffirelli's classic 1968 Romeo and Juliet,  to Sergio Leone's iconic Once Upon A Time in America.

As the official on-set photographer to the biggest stars of the Big Screen, Lari's stills are infused with a sense of ease that comes from his relationship with the actors and directors that he worked with. His portfolio includes some incredible shots of iconic figures caught off guard; we see John Lennon mucking about in a long dark wig, and Jane Fonda stealing the director's chair to put her feet up between takes. Facing us from the back of that chair is the Director's name: Roger Vadim. Lari has tipped the viewer a cheeky wink...

As much as his considerable skill with the camera, Emilio Lari's ebullient personality and playful eye characterises his unique brand of  photography.

As Francis Ford Coppola said of him, "you...can't separate the work from the man, but both lifted your spirits."

Lari also did personal photoshoots for celebrities, including David Bowie, Jodie Foster, Robert De Niro, Michelle Pfeiffer and others.

Selected Films

 Help!, Director: Richard Lester, 1965
 Candy, Director: Christian Marquand, 1968
 Barbarella, Director: Roger Vadim, 1968
 Romeo and Juliet, Director: Franco Zeffirelli, 1968
 Kelly's Heroes, Director: Brian G. Hutton, 1969
 The Beloved, Director: George P. Cosmatos, 1971
 The Godfather, Director: Francis Ford Coppola, 1972
 The Godfather Part II, Director: Francis Ford Coppola, 1974
 Just a Gigolo, Director: David Hemmings, 1978
 Raging Bull, Director: Martin Scorsese, 1980
 Once Upon A Time in America, Director: Sergio Leone, 1984
 Ladyhawke, Director: Richard Donner, 1985
 The Godfather Part III, Director: Francis Ford Coppola, 1990

References

External links
  Italian Cultural Institute in London 
 
 

Living people
Italian photographers
Movie stills photographers
Year of birth missing (living people)